Gary Green is an American conductor, specializing in the wind band.

Green is a champion of new music for the wind band, and has commissioned works by such composers as Eric Whitacre, Michael Colgrass, Kenneth Fuchs, David Maslanka, Mark Camphouse, and Christopher Rouse. On 29 March 2007, he premiered Rouse's Wolf Rounds at Carnegie Hall in New York with the University of Miami-Frost Wind Ensemble. In February 2006, he conducted the East Coast Premiere of David Maslanka's Mass after the composer's 2005 revision, which was performed by the University of Miami School of Music's Frost Wind Ensemble, Choral Union, and Miami Children's Chorus, featuring soloists Janice Chandler-Eteme, soprano and Jeffrey Morrissey, baritone. He was most recently professor and chair, Department of Instrumental Performance, and director of bands at the University of Miami's Frost School of Music, where he taught wind band conducting and literature and served as the conductor of the Wind Ensemble, a post he held from 1993 until his retirement in 2015. The University of Miami-Frost School of Music wind ensemble has recorded for the Albany label. Other recent performances include Mahler's First Symphony with the UM-Frost Symphony Orchestra.

Green holds a B.M. degree from Boise State University and an M.M. degree from the University of Idaho. He formerly conducted the University of Connecticut's Symphony Band, Wind Ensemble, and Marching Band. Green also was director of bands at University High School in Spokane, Washington, one of the most widely respected band programs in the nation. Throughout his career, Green has received numerous honors and awards. His recent conducting activities include events in Florida, Texas, Connecticut, Kansas, Maryland, Georgia, Utah, Virginia, Washington, and others. In addition, he has conducted all state, regional, national, and international honor bands, most notably in Taipei, Taiwan.

References

Year of birth missing (living people)
Living people
American male conductors (music)
Boise State University alumni
University of Idaho alumni
University of Miami faculty
University of Connecticut faculty
21st-century American conductors (music)
21st-century American male musicians